Fanos Katelaris (born 26 August 1996) is a Cypriot professional footballer who plays as a defensive midfielder for Belgian First Division A club Oostende. He is also of Congolese origin through his mother.

Club career
On 15 June 2022 Oostende announced the signing of Katelaris on a free transfer.

Career statistics

Club

International career

International goals
Scores and results list Cyprus' goal tally first.

References

External links
 https://web.archive.org/web/20140702185935/http://www.omonoia.com.cy/?lang=GR&tab=football&section=omonoiateam
 https://web.archive.org/web/20150923202140/http://www.cfa.com.cy/?lang=Gr&show=players&PlayerID=145455&CompetitionID=1374198

1996 births
Living people
Cypriot footballers
Association football midfielders
Cyprus youth international footballers
Cyprus under-21 international footballers
Cyprus international footballers
AC Omonia players
Alki Larnaca FC players
Zalaegerszegi TE players
Olympiakos Nicosia players
K.V. Oostende players
Nemzeti Bajnokság I players
Belgian Pro League players
Expatriate footballers in Hungary
Expatriate footballers in Belgium
Cypriot expatriate sportspeople in Hungary
Cypriot expatriate sportspeople in Belgium
Cypriot people of Democratic Republic of the Congo descent